Merle Louise (born Merle Louise Letowt, April 15, 1934) is an American actress, best known for appearing in four Stephen Sondheim musicals, most famously as "The Beggar Woman" in Sweeney Todd.

Broadway and Sondheim
Early in her career, (when she was still known as Merle Letowt), she played "Thelma" in the original cast of Gypsy (1959). Eventually, she moved up to the lead role of "Dainty June", playing it for much of the Broadway run and on the first national tour.

Louise returned to Broadway in Company (1970) as "Susan". Her biggest success was as "the Beggar Woman" in Sweeney Todd: The Demon Barber of Fleet Street (1979), for which she won the Drama Desk Award as Outstanding Featured Actress in a Musical. However, her "ravaging crazy" performance is not preserved in the video recording as she was not a member of the national tour that was videotaped.

In Into the Woods (1987), she played a trio of roles: the ethereal "Cinderella's Mother", the practical "Granny" (of "Little Red Riding Hood" fame), and the unseen vengeful "Giantess".

Louise has originated roles with other Broadway composers as well. She played "Mme. Dindon" in Jerry Herman's La Cage aux Folles (1983) and "Molina's Mother" in Kander and Ebb's Kiss of the Spider Woman (1993), a role she also played on London's West End, in Toronto and on the national tour.

Off-Broadway, she created the role of Cecily MacIntosh in Charlotte Sweet (1982). Regionally, she is an acclaimed actress in classics by Shakespeare, Chekhov, Molière, Pinter, Ibsen, and Shaw.

The cast of the Broadway show, title of show (along with some of their theatrical friends), created a game based around Merle Louise, entitled "Six Degrees of Merle Louise", which is based on Six Degrees of Kevin Bacon except that it generally uses Broadway musicals in place of movies to link two performers.

On-camera and later career
Louise's on-camera work has been limited, most notably appearing in the televised production of Into the Woods and a documentary about the recording of the Original Cast Album of Company. She has had some guest appearances on shows such as Law & Order.

Her most recent performances include "Frau Schneider" in Cabaret, "Mme. Armfeldt" in A Little Night Music, Lady Henslowe in Elizabeth Rex with Nicu's Spoon Theater Company and "Jeanette" in The Full Monty in Massachusetts, and in New York she appeared in Luke Yankee's award-winning show, The Jesus Hickey in July 2007.

Broadway credits
 Billy Elliot: The Musical (Grandma understudy/Ensemble) 2008
 Into the Woods (Cinderella's Mother/Granny/Giantess) 1997
 Kiss of the Spider Woman (Molina's Mother) 1993
 Into the Woods (Cinderella's Mother/Granny/Giantess) 1987
 La Cage aux Folles (Mme. Dindon) 1983
 Sweeney Todd: The Demon Barber of Fleet Street (Beggar Woman) 1979
 Company (Susan) 1970
 Gypsy (Thelma; later Dainty June) 1959

References

External links

 Profile, ibdb.com; accessed June 15, 2017.

1934 births
Living people
American musical theatre actresses
American sopranos
Drama Desk Award winners
Place of birth missing (living people)